The 1st Separate Special Purpose Brigade named after Ivan Bohun is a brigade of the Ukrainian Ground Forces formed in 2022.

History 
It is the Ukrainian ground forces.

Structure 
As of 2023, the brigade's structure is as follows:

 1st Separate Special Purpose Brigade, N/A
 Headquarters & Headquarters Company
 515th Separate Battalion
 516th Separate Battalion
 517th Separate Battalion
 518th Separate Battalion
 Tank Battalion

References 

Military units and formations of the 2022 Russian invasion of Ukraine
Military units and formations of Ukraine
Military of Ukraine